"The Family Nobody Wanted" was an American television play broadcast on December 20, 1956, as part of the CBS television series, Playhouse 90.  It was the 12th episode of the first season of Playhouse 90.

Plot
The teleplay is based on a true story about a divinity student, Carl Doss, and his wife, Helen Doss, of Redlands, California, who adopt 12 children of various ancestries.

Cast
 Nanette Fabray as Helen Doss
 Lew Ayres as Carl Doss
 Tim Hovey as Donny
 Cherylene Lee as Asian Child
 Dick Kay Hong as Timmy, Adopted Kid

Dale Evans hosted the broadcast.

Production
Martin Manulis was the producer and John Frankenheimer the director. George Bruce wrote the teleplay based on the memoir, The Family Nobody Wanted, by Helen Doss.

Reception
J. P. Shanley of The New York Times credited the "excellent performances" of Fabray and Ayres and called it "charming entertainment."

References

1956 American television episodes
Playhouse 90 (season 1) episodes
1956 television plays